Sir Henry de Sandwich was Lord Warden of the Cinque Ports during the 13th century.

He was a son of Simon de Sandwich of Preston in Kent, where Henry was born, and also held the post of Constable of Dover Castle.

He married Joan d'Auberville.  Their daughter Juliana de Sandwich was born in 1245 and resided at Preston in Kent (died 1327); she married William de Leybourne (Leyburn), Lord Leyburn, (1242–1309).

The tomb of Henry de Sandwich is in the Chapel of St. Bartholomew located in St. Bartholomew's Hospital, Dover Road, Sandwich.  Open for viewing every Sunday at normal worshipping times.

References

Sandwich, Henry de
13th-century English people
13th-century English Navy personnel